Buhr Park is a 39-acre public park in Ann Arbor, Michigan.

There is a large public swimming pool and a smaller children's wading pool with interactive toys. Buhr Park also includes  of rolling hills, picnic areas with barbecue grills, a children's play area, softball diamonds, soccer fields and outdoor tennis courts. The Cobblestone Farm and Museum is located on the park grounds.

The Buhr Outdoor Ice Arena and Cross Country Ski Center facilitates winter sports such as ice skating and hockey.  It provides groomed trails for skiing set by snowmobile as well as rental, equipment, locker rooms, etc.

The Buhr Park Children's Wet Meadow is a group of wet meadow ecosystems designed as an educational opportunity for school-age children.

References

Ann Arbor City Government

External links

Urban public parks
Parks in Michigan
Protected areas of Washtenaw County, Michigan
Tourist attractions in Ann Arbor, Michigan